Yotov, sometimes incorrectly transliterated as Iotov, is a Bulgarian surname. Notable people with this surname include:

 Boris Yotov (born 1996), Azerbaijani rower
 Gonos Yotov, also known as Gonos Yotas (1880–1911), Bulgarian-Greek fighter
 Tsvetan Yotov (born 1989), Bulgarian football player
 Valentin Yotov, Bulgarian chess Grandmaster
 Velko Yotov, Bulgarian football player
 Yoto Yotov (born 1969), Bulgarian-Croatian weightlifter

Bulgarian-language surnames